Boxwell is a hamlet in Gloucestershire, England, near the village of Leighterton

Boxwell Court is a Grade II* listed manor house from the 15th or 16th century.

References

Villages in Gloucestershire